Athletics was contested at the 1954 Asian Games in Manila, Philippines from May 2 to May 5.

Medalists

Men

Women

Medal table

References
Asian Games Results. GBR Athletics. Retrieved on 2014-10-04.
Women's relay medallists. Incheon2014. Retrieved on 2014-10-04.
Men's relay medallists. Incheon2014. Retrieved on 2014-10-04.

 
1954 Asian Games events
1954
Asian Games
1954 Asian Games